The 1942 Arizona State Bulldogs football team was an American football team that represented Arizona State Teachers College (later renamed Arizona State University) in the Border Conference during the 1942 college football season. In their first season under head coach Hilman Walker, the Bulldogs compiled a 2–8 record (2–5 against Border opponents) and were outscored by their opponents by a combined total of 256 to 53.

Schedule

References

Arizona State
Arizona State Sun Devils football seasons
Arizona State Sun Devils football